Scott Gale may refer to:
 Scott Gale (rugby union) (born 1994), Australian rugby union player
 Scott Gale (rugby league) (1965–2004), Australian rugby league player